Mila Gojsalić (also traditionally "Mile Gojsalića") (died 1530) is a Croatian folk heroine.

She lived in time of Ottoman wars in Croatia. In 1530, Ottoman Ahmed-pasha gathered an army of 10 000 men with a goal to conquer Poljica. He made a camp in a place called Podgrac (modern ). Mila Gojsalić volunteered to sacrifice herself and lose her virginity to the Ahmed-pasha in order to be able to infiltrate the Turkish camp and blow up the munitions stockpile, killing Ahmed-pasha and numerous officers and soldiers. That act completely surprised and confused remaining Turkish soldiers who were then overrun by people of Poljica.

Ivan Meštrović sculptured the statue of her, installed above the town of Omiš, while Jakov Gotovac composed the opera to her honour. August Šenoa also wrote about her.

In her birthplace, every summer there is a cultural manifestation called The days of Mila Gojsalić. Her house is still in the village and is completely renewed.

References

External links
  Kulturno ljeto: DANI MILE GOJSALIĆ - Kostanje 2007. 

1530 deaths
People from Omiš
Croatian folklore
16th-century Croatian people
Year of birth unknown
16th-century Christian martyrs